The Medienboard Berlin-Brandenburg is the body responsible for Film Funding and Media Business Development in the states of Berlin and Brandenburg. It is also the first point of contact for international and German professionals active in the film and media industries.
 
The Medienboard's Film Funding department has an annual budget of roughly €24 million. Among the films that have received support from the Medienboard in the past couple of years are the Bollywood production Don 2 starring Shah Rukh Khan, Inglourious Basterds directed by Quentin Tarantino, The White Ribbon directed by Michael Haneke, The Ghost Writer directed by Roman Polanski, The Reader directed by Stephen Daldry, Unknown directed by Jaume Collet-Serra, When We Leave directed by Feo Aladag and Keinohrhasen directed by Til Schweiger.

The Medienboard's Media Business Development department is responsible for promoting and showcasing the region's national and international image and standing. It provides current information on the region and encourages the state and industry-wide networking of the film and media industry. It also supports film and media companies interested in setting up operations in the capital region. With an annual budget of roughly €5 million, the department also supports regional film and media-related projects as well as the development of innovative audiovisual content in the fields of games, Web 2.0 and mobile.

Film Funding 
The Medienboard funds German and international films in the categories of Development, Production (feature films, documentaries, animation, short films and international co-productions) and Sales & Distribution (in Germany). The funds provided by the Medienboard are conditionally repayable loans and must be spent entirely in Berlin-Brandenburg. They can be combined with other funding.

Funding for Media Business Development 
The Medienboard funds projects and measures designed to promote the ongoing development, professionalization and showcasing of the film and media industry in Berlin and Brandenburg. These include awards, competitions, festivals, events, professionalization programs, children's cinema projects, cinema-cultural events and other film-related initiatives. The Medienboard also supports the development of innovative audiovisual content as an important element of a future-oriented audiovisual culture. With a budget of €1 million per year, the program is designed to motivate young and creative companies in the digital industries – but also traditional content producers – to invest in the development of innovative and interactive formats.

MEDIA Antenna Berlin-Brandenburg 
MEDIA Antenna Berlin-Brandenburg, which is affiliated with the Medienboard, is one of the four German information offices set up as part of the EU's Brussels-based MEDIA Programme. It provides information and support for producers, distributors, cinema operators, festivals and audiovisual companies with regard to the funding measures provided by the MEDIA Programme. It also supports applicants in filing submissions. MEDIA Antenna is financed by the MEDIA Programme, the Medienboard and the Mitteldeutsche Medienförderung (MDM - Central German Media Fund) in Leipzig.

Berlin Brandenburg Film Commission 
The Berlin Brandenburg Film Commission (bbfc) is a department within the Medienboard that assists film and media companies interested in shooting in Germany's capital region. The bbfc helps in finding locations, acquiring filming permits and connecting to the local film industry. The Film Commission also holds a comprehensive and constantly updated database of addresses and images covering the Berlin-Brandenburg film and media region.

Capital Regions for Cinema (CRC) 
In 2005, the Medienboard Berlin-Brandenburg joined with the Ile de France Film Commission, the Roma Lazio Film Commission and the Madrid Film Commission to create a network known as the Capital Regions for Cinema (CRC). The CRC seeks to bring together the creative potential of these European film metropolises and to develop overall conditions for cooperation and coproduction. Four times a year, during the film festivals in Berlin, Cannes, Rome and San Sebastian, European producers pitch their new projects as part of the CRC meetings.

Brandenburg